First Friday may refer to:
 First Friday Devotions, a Catholic Devotion
 First Friday (public event) in some cities of the USA;